James Prentice may refer to:

 James D. Prentice (1899–1979), Royal Navy and Royal Canadian Navy officer
 James Douglas Prentice (1861–1911), Scottish-born rancher and political figure in British Columbia
 Jim Prentice (1956–2016), Canadian politician
 Jim Prentice (footballer) (born 1949), Australian rules footballer
 Jimmy Prentice (1885–1915), Scottish amateur golfer